The Mosquito Coast is a 1986 American drama film directed by Peter Weir and starring Harrison Ford, Helen Mirren, Andre Gregory, and River Phoenix. It is based on the 1981 novel of the same name by Paul Theroux. The film tells the story of a family that leaves the United States and tries to find a happier and simpler life in the jungles of Central America. However, their jungle paradise quickly turns into a dystopia as their stubborn father's behavior becomes increasingly erratic and aggressive. It was shot in the cities of Cartersville and Rome in Georgia, in addition to Baltimore, Maryland and Belize.

Plot
Allie Fox is a brilliant but stubborn inventor who has grown fed up with the American Dream and consumerism. Furthermore, he believes that  a nuclear war is on the horizon as a result of American greed and crime. After Allie and his eldest son Charlie acquire the components at a local dump, he finishes assembling his latest creation, an ice machine known as Fat Boy. Allie's boss, Mr. Polski, an asparagus farm owner, complains that Allie is not tending to the asparagus, which is rotting. Allie, Charlie, and Allie's youngest son, Jerry, meet Mr. Polski, and Allie shows him "Fat Boy." The machine leaves Polski unimpressed. As he drives past the fields, a dejected Allie comments on immigrants picking asparagus, and says that where they come from, they might think of ice as a luxury.

The next morning, Allie throws a party for the immigrant workers before telling his family that they're leaving the United States. On board a Panamanian barge, the family meets Reverend Spellgood, a missionary, his wife, and their daughter, Emily. Allie and the Reverend clash due to their opposing religious views. When the barge docks in Belize City, the families disembark and go their separate ways. From a drunken German, Allie purchases a small village called Jeronimo located in the rainforest along the river.

Mr. Haddy takes Allie and his family upriver to Jeronimo. Allie meets the inhabitants and proceeds to start building a new, "advanced" civilization, inventing many new things in the process. The locals take kindly to Allie and his family, but Allie's will to build a utopian civilization keeps them working to their limits. Reverend Spellgood arrives to convert Jeronimo's citizens. In the process, Allie and Spellgood angrily denounce each other, leading to a permanent schism: Allie believes Spellgood to be a religious zealot; Spellgood believes Allie to be a communist. Allie sets to constructing a huge version of "Fat Boy" that can supply the town with ice. Upon completing the machine, Allie hears rumors of a native tribe in the mountains that has never seen ice. Allie recruits his two sons to carry a load of ice into the jungle to supply the tribe. Upon arriving, Allie finds that the load has melted, and that the tribe has already been visited by missionaries.

When Allie returns to Jeronimo, he learns that Spellgood has left with much of the populace, scaring them with stories of God's biblical destruction. The near-empty town is visited by three rebels, who demand to use Jeronimo as a base. Allie and his family agree to accommodate them while Allie concocts a plan to be rid of them. Set on freezing them to death, Allie bunks the rebels up in the giant ice machine, tells Charlie to lock its only other exit, and activates it. The rebels, waking in panic, try to shoot their way out. To Allie's horror, the rebels' gunfire sets off an explosion within the machine. By the next morning, both the machine and the family's home is in ruins, and chemicals from the destroyed machine have severely polluted the river.

Forced downstream, Allie and his family arrive at the coast. Mother and the children rejoice, believing they can return to the United States. Allie, refusing to believe his dream has been shattered, announces that they have all they need on the beach and tells them that the United States has been destroyed in a nuclear war. Settling on the beach in a houseboat he has built, and refusing assistance from Mr. Haddy, Allie believes that the family has accomplished building a utopia. One night, the storm surge from a tropical cyclone nearly forces the family out to sea until Charlie reveals that he has been hiding motor components (secretly given to him by Mr. Haddy), allowing them to start the motor on the boat.

Forced to travel upstream once again, Charlie and Jerry grow resentful of their father. Coming ashore when the family stumbles across Spellgood's compound, Allie sees barbed wire, and mutters that the settlement is a Christian concentration camp. While the rest of the family sleeps, Charlie and Jerry sneak over to the Spellgood home. They find out that the United States was not destroyed and that Emily will assist them in escaping from Allie. Before Charlie can persuade Mother and his sisters to leave, Allie sets Spellgood's church on fire. Spellgood shoots Allie, paralyzing him from the neck down. The family escapes aboard the boat.

The family begins traveling downriver again, with Allie drifting in and out of consciousness. Allie asks his wife if they are going upstream. She lies to him for the first time. Charlie's narration reports the death of Allie, but gives hope that the rest of the family can live their lives freely from now on.

Cast

 Harrison Ford as Allie Fox
 Helen Mirren as Margot "Mother" Fox
 River Phoenix as Charlie Fox
 Conrad Roberts as Mr. Haddy
 Andre Gregory as Reverend Spellgood
 Martha Plimpton as Emily Spellgood
 Melanie Boland as Mrs. Spellgood
 Dick O'Neill as Mr. Polski
 Jadrien Steele as Jerry Fox
 Hilary Gordon as April Fox
 Rebecca Gordon as Clover Fox
 Alice Heffernan-Sneed as Mrs. Polski
 Jason Alexander as Hardware Clerk
 William Newman as Captain Smalls
 Aurora Clavel as Mrs. Maywit
 Butterfly McQueen as Mrs. Kennywick

Production
Producer Jerome Hellman bought the rights to Theroux's novel as soon as it was published, and Weir committed to filming it. Jack Nicholson was originally offered the lead role, but backed out partly because he could not watch Los Angeles Lakers games in Belize, where part of the film was to be shot.

As the film went into pre-production, and Weir was in Central America scouting for locations, the financial backing for the film fell through and the project was suspended indefinitely. In the meantime, Weir was approached to direct Witness starring Harrison Ford. The film, which was Weir's first American production, was a critical and commercial success, garnering eight Academy Award nominations including Weir for Best Director, Ford for Best Actor, and the film itself for Best Film. During the production of Witness, Weir discussed The Mosquito Coast with Ford who became interested in the role of Allie Fox (though Ford's agent was less enthusiastic). With Ford attached to the project, financial backing and distribution for the film was easier to find (ultimately from Saul Zaentz and Warner Bros.).

Filming began the week of February 7, 1986, in Belize and finished there on April 26 before moving to Georgia. Weir and Ford famously missed the Academy Awards ceremony for which they had both been nominated for Witness, which won two Oscars, for Best Screenplay and Best Film Editing.

The film contains the last feature film role of Butterfly McQueen, who had a prominent role in Gone with the Wind. She plays a lapsed churchgoer, and in real life was a vocal atheist.

Reception
The film was initially a critical and commercial disappointment, but has since received much stronger modern reviews. On Rotten Tomatoes the film has an approval rating of 77% based on 22 reviews, with an average rating of 6.5/10. The site's critics consensus reads: "Harrison Ford capably tackles a tough, unlikable role, producing a fascinating and strange character study." On Metacritic the film has a weighted average score of 49 out of 100, based on 12 critics, indicating "mixed or average reviews". Audiences surveyed by CinemaScore gave the film an average grade B− on an A+ to F scale.

Siskel & Ebert were split, Siskel giving the film a "thumbs up" and Ebert giving it a "thumbs down," criticizing Allie Fox for being "boring." However, he did compliment Ford's performance. Vincent Canby of The New York Times called it "utterly flat." In her review for The Washington Post, Rita Kempley wrote:  In her review for the Los Angeles Times, Sheila Benson wrote, "He's orchestrated The Mosquito Coast'''s action to match Fox's progressive mental state, from rage to explosion to squalls and finally to hurricane velocity; however, the film leaves us not with an apotheosis, but exhaustion." In his review for The Globe and Mail, Jay Scott wrote, "The Mosquito Coast'' is a work of consummate craftsmanship and it's spectacularly acted, down to the smallest roles ... but its field of vision is as narrow and eventually as claustrophobic as Allie's." The negative reviews the film received prompted Harrison Ford to defend the film in the media: 

With a production budget of $25 million, the film made a little over $14 million in North America. Despite being one of his least commercially successful films, Ford has defended it, saying in a 1992 interview:

Then-U.S. President Ronald Reagan viewed this film at Camp David on November 22, 1986.

References

External links
 
 
 
 Production notes

1986 films
1980s adventure drama films
American adventure drama films
American dystopian films
Films directed by Peter Weir
Films scored by Maurice Jarre
Films set in Belize
Films set in Honduras
Films shot in Baltimore
Films shot in Belize
Films shot in Georgia (U.S. state)
Films with screenplays by Paul Schrader
American survival films
Warner Bros. films
1986 drama films
Paul Theroux
1980s English-language films
1980s American films
1986 thriller films